Dmytro Ivanovych Chyzhevsky (Дмитро Іванович Чижевський) (March 3, 1894 – April 18, 1977) was Ukrainian-born scholar of Slavic literature and the literary baroque. He was born in Russian Empire of Russian-Polish-Ukrainian ancestry. He was a professor of Slavic studies at the Heidelberg University.

Biography 

Dmytro Chyzhevsky was born on 3 March 1894, at Oleksandriia, in the Kherson Governorate of the Russian Empire, near the Black Sea. His first interest was philosophy, and his teachers were Nikolay Lossky, Vasyl Zenkivskyi, and Georgy Chelpanov. From 1911 to 1913 he studied philosophy and literature at the University of St. Petersburg and afterwards at the department of history and philology at St. Vladimir University of Kyiv, where he graduated in 1919. During the Russian Revolution he was involved in politics and was a member of the Mensheviks.  After teaching at high school in Kyiv  from 1919 to 1921, he emigrated from Soviet Russia to Germany and continued his philosophical studies at Heidelberg during the winter semester 1921/22, and then at Freiberg, where he was a student of Edmund Husserl (SS 1922- WS1923/24).

He lived in Prague from 1924 to 1932, where he became a professor in the Ukrainian university there, and was a member of the prestigious Prague linguistic circle, a group of linguists and philologists that included Roman Jakobson.

In 1932 he moved to the University of Halle in Germany, where he completed his dissertation in Philosophy, Hegel in Russland, under Adhémar Gelb and Paul Menzer.  During World War II, Chyzhevsky took a position at the University of Marburg.

After the war he moved to the United States of America in 1949, and became a professor of Slavic studies at Harvard University.

In 1956 he returned to Germany and settled in Heidelberg as a professor of Slavic studies; where he remained until his death on April 18, 1977.

Work 

Chyzhevsky wrote on a broad range of subjects, including folklore, history, philosophy, linguistics, Slavic and comparative literature. He wrote monographs on the Ukrainian philosopher Hryhorii Skovoroda (1974) and the German philosopher Georg Wilhelm Friedrich Hegel (1934). He is also known for his studies of the Ukrainian writer, Nikolai Gogol.

He argued for the existence of a literary baroque and wrote several books on the subject, becoming one of the foremost authorities on baroque literature.

Bibliography 

 Логіка (1924)
 Dostojevskij Studien (1931)
 Hegel bei den Slaven (1934)
 Štúrova filozofia života (1941)
 Geschichte der altrussischen Literatur: Kiever Epoche (1948 and 1960)
 Outline of Comparative Slavic Literatures (1952)
 On Romanticism in Slavic Literatures (1957)
 Das heilige Russland (1959)
 Russland zwischen Ost und West (1961)
 Russische Literaturgeschichte des 19 Jahrhunderts (1964)
 Comparative History of Slavic Literatures (1971)
 Skovoroda, Dichter, Denker, Mystiker (1974)
 A History of Ukrainian Literature (1975)

References 

1894 births
1977 deaths
Slavists
Harvard University faculty
Academic staff of the University of Marburg
Academic staff of Heidelberg University
Emigrants from the Russian Empire to Germany
German emigrants to the United States
Mensheviks